Taliworks Corporation Berhad is a Malaysian public utilities conglomerate. It is a member of LGB Group. Taliworks Corporation is involved in water treatment, waste management, highway concession and construction. Taliworks holds a 21-year concession rights for the operation and management of the Tianjin Panlou Life Waste Transfer Station, in Tianjin, China. Taliworks' research and technology arm has a production facility that produces CK21 bacteria, which is used for water and wastewater sludge treatment in China. The company is listed on Bursa Malaysia. The company has also purchased a controlling stake in highway operator Grand Saga Sdn Bhd for 107.8 million ringgit, or roughly 31 million USD.

Profile 
Taliworks Corporation Berhad is listed on the Main Market of the Malaysia Securities Exchange Berhad (Bursa Malaysia) under the Trading/Services Sector (Name and Code: TALIWRK .
Taliworks Corporation Berhad is engaged in the management, operation and maintenance of water treatment, waste management, highway concession and construction.

Services 
It has multiple segments:.
water, which is engaged in the management, operations and maintenance of water treatment plants and water distribution systems
investment holding, which involves investment holding and dormant companies;
construction, which is engaged in the design, construction and supervision of water supply works under a turnkey contract,
waste management, which provides management, operation and maintenance of waste management services and technical services relating to waste management.
Highway, which is engaged in the management and operation of the Cheras-Kajang Highway concession (Grand Saga Sdn Bhd) which expires in year 2027.
Taliworks has also secured a 21-year concession rights for the operation and maintenance of Tianjin Panlou Life Waste Transfer Station in China.
Taliworks Analytical Laboratory is certified with MS ISO/IEC 17025:2005.

References

External links 
Taliworks enters into agreement with Puresino International 
ISO/IEC 17025 Resource Center 
Key Developments - Taliworks 

Companies listed on Bursa Malaysia
1987 establishments in Malaysia
Companies established in 1987